The two  were protected cruisers built for the Imperial Japanese Navy (IJN) during the 1880s. As Japan lacked the industrial capacity to build such warships herself, the vessels were built in Britain. Both ships participated in numerous actions during the First Sino-Japanese War of 1894–1895 and in the Russo-Japanese War of 1904–1905.

Background
The 1876 Treaty of Gangwha forcibly opened up Joseon Korea to the Japanese, much like the Americans forced the Japanese Tokugawa Shogunate to sign the Convention of Kanagawa in 1854, and Joseon formally withdrew from its status as a tributary of Qing China. The Chinese made no significant response at that time and King Gojong began a modest effort to modernize the country to allow it to better withstand foreign pressure. This upset conservative elements in the army and the population which led to the Imo Incident of 1882 where the rioters attacked the Japanese Legation, forcing the diplomats to take refuge aboard a British ship and in the royal palace. The Chinese sent troops that crushed the rebellion and they reasserted control over Joseon, reducing it to a vassal state, rather than resuming its previous pro-forma tributary status.

Concerned about the rising power of Imperial Russia and Japan, Li Hongzhang, Viceroy of Zhili Province, and generally responsible for relations with Russia, Korea and Japan had begun a program of gradually expanding the Beiyang Fleet after the 1874 Japanese reprisal expedition to Taiwan. An 1880 order for two s from the German Empire capped the program as neither the Imperial Russian Navy nor the IJN could match them once they were delivered. 

In response the Japanese Navy Ministry submitted a budget for the Fourth Naval Expansion Program in 1881, but it was rejected as too expensive. The Ministry then attempted to purchase existing warships from European shipyards after the Imo Incident, but was only able to buy the unprotected cruiser  from Chile because its delivery had been embargoed by the builder because of the ongoing War of the Pacific between Chile, Bolivia and Peru. It then proposed the Fifth Naval Expansion Program that was approved in early 1883 after negotiations to reduce its expense. This included funds for one ironclad and a protected cruiser, but the designs for the former proved to be too expensive and the IJN decided to follow the recommendation of Armstrong Mitchell's chief naval architect, William White, to build two improved versions of the pioneering Chilean protected cruiser  (later purchased by the IJN and renamed Izumi). 

The "Elswick"-type protected cruisers, of which Esmeralda was the first example, had been designed by White's predecessor, George Rendel, for Armstrong Mitchell as a private venture. It was of great interest to Japan because of her high speed, powerful armament, armor protection and relatively low cost, especially since the IJN lacked the resources at the time to purchase ironclads.

When completed, Naniwa was considered the most advanced and most powerful cruiser in the world. However, the extremely fast development of technology, weaponry and armor in this field of ship design meant that the supremacy of this design was very short.

The two cruisers together cost £546,980. Prince Yamashina Kikumaro attended the launch, and afterwards had dinner with Baron William Armstrong, who made a toast that "the ship was destined to the service of a country which was likely never to come into collision with our own peace-loving country".

Design and description

 
The Naniwa-class ships displaced  at normal load. The sister ships were fitted with a plough-shaped naval ram of mild steel below the waterline and had a partial double bottom extending between the forward and aft magazines. 

The ship's crew consisted of 338 officers and ratings.

As built, the main battery of the Naniwa-class cruisers initially consisted of two 35-caliber  Krupp cannon in barbettes fore and aft of the superstructure. Each barbette was fitted with a fixed loading station in its rear and the guns had to return to this position to reload. Two hundred rounds per gun were stored. The secondary armament was initially six 35-caliber  Krupp cannon mounted in semi-circular sponsons on the main deck, with 450 rounds per gun. All of these guns were protected against the weather by gun shields. Defense against torpedo boats was provided by six QF 6 pounder Hotchkiss guns, ten 1-inch Nordenfelt guns and four 11-mm, 10-barrel Nordenfelt guns. In addition, there were four  Whitehead torpedo tubes mounted on the main deck. After the First Sino-Japanese War, both Naniwa and Takachiho were re-armed with eight Elswick QF 6 inch /40 naval guns in order to increase stability and standardize on ammunition for the fleet.

Ships in class
Two Naniwa-class cruisers were purchased from Armstrong Whitworth in England. Naniwa was lost before the start of World War I, Takachiho was lost soon after hostilities commenced.

Ordered in 1883, launched 18 March 1885, and completed 1 December 1885, Naniwa played a major role in the First Sino-Japanese War, notably at the Battle of Pungdo and the Battle of the Yalu River. During the Russo-Japanese War she was present at the opening Battle of Chemulpo Bay, but was subsequently assigned a reserve role. After the war, she was lost after running aground on 26 July 1910 on the coast of Urup, in the Kurile Islands .

Ordered in 1883, launched 16 May 1885, and completed 1 December 1885, Takachiho participated in the Battle of the Yalu River in the First Sino-Japanese War. In the Russo-Japanese War she was present at the opening Battle of Chemulpo Bay, but was subsequently assigned a reserve role. In World War I, while covering the invasion of German-held Tsingtao, she was torpedoed by the German torpedo boat S90 on 14 October 1914 and sank with the loss of 271 officers and men.

Notes

References

 

 

 (contact the editor at lars.ahlberg@halmstad.mail.postnet.se for subscription information)

 
 

Cruiser classes